The 2022–23 Hannover 96 season is the 127th season in the football club's history and 27th overall and fourth consecutive season in the second flight of German football, the 2. Bundesliga. Hannover 96 will also participate in this season's edition of the domestic cup, the DFB-Pokal. This is the 64th season for Hannover in the Heinz von Heiden Arena, located in Hanover, Lower Saxony, Germany.

Players

Squad information

Out on loan

Transfers

In

Out

Friendly matches

Competitions

Overview

2. Bundesliga

League table

Results summary

Results by round

Matches

DFB-Pokal

Statistics

Appearances and goals

|}

Goalscorers

Clean sheets

Disciplinary record

References

Hannover 96 seasons
Hannover 96